Liam Ó Maonlaí (born 7 November 1964 in Monkstown, County Dublin, Ireland) is an Irish musician best known as a member of Hothouse Flowers.  Ó Maonlaí formed the band in 1985 with his schoolmate Fiachna Ó Braonáin.

Biography
He attended Scoil Lorcáin and Coláiste Eoin, which is a Gaelscoil on Dublin's southside, although he credits his father as being the main influence for his love of the Irish language, of which he is a fluent speaker. He won an under-18 all-Ireland award for his skills on the bodhrán. Ó Maonlai first formed a band called The Complex with childhood friend Kevin Shields and drummer Colm Ó Cíosóig.  After Liam left to form the Hothouse Flowers in 1984, Shields and Ó Cíosóig were joined by vocalist Dave Conway and keyboardist Tina (who used no surname), and renamed themselves My Bloody Valentine, taking their name from a low-budget horror film.

Ó Maonlaí is also an active member of the Nuclear Free Future movement and contributed to the hosting of events in Carnsore and in Wexford Town in 2001. In 2004 he was a guest at the Barefoot College, located at Rajasthan, India. In 2005 he released a solo album entitled Rían which is a collection of tunes and songs in Irish. He performed in the 2009 Dublin to Gaza benefit concert.

The 2008 documentary Dambé: The Mali Project tells the story of his 3,000 mile cross-cultural musical adventure with Paddy Keenan and friends, and features performances from the Festival au Désert.

Acting 
 I Could Read the Sky (1999) – Joe
 Timbuktu (2004) – Conor
 The Busker (2006) – Patrick O'Mallie
 Dambé: The Mali Project (2008), (documentary)

Discography
 Rian (2005)
 To Be Touched (2009)

Guest singles

References

External links 
Liam Ó Maonlaí website
Hothouse Flowers website
Liam Ó Maonlaí information
Biography
 
 

1964 births
Living people
ALT (band) members
Bodhrán players
Hothouse Flowers members
Irish male singer-songwriters
Irish rock singers
Irish-language singers
Musicians from County Dublin
People educated at Coláiste Eoin
Sean-nós singers
The Complex (band) members